Kandahar Central Jail, also known as Sarpuza Prison or Sarposa Prison, is a minimum security prison in Kandahar, Afghanistan. It has been historically used for the incarceration of common criminals of Kandahar Province. In the last two decades, the facility has also been used to hold up Taliban and other insurgents. The name "Sarpuza" is a historical neighborhood in the city of Kandahar. As of 2017, the prison has approximately 1,900 inmates, and its warden is Col. Abdul Wali Hesarak.

The prison has been subject to two major escapes, first in a coordinated attack in May 2008, and more recently in a tunneling escape that occurred in April 2011. The Afghan government is in the process of relocating Kandahar Central Jail to the Daman, Afghanistan, which is located outside the city limits to the south. Over 1,000 prisoners were released from the prison by Taliban insurgents in August 2021, after they gained control of the city as part of the Taliban offensive.

History
The year in which the Kandahar Central Jail was built is unconfirmed. It was renovated in the 1970s to house common criminals of Kandahar Province. Some prisoners who had committed murders were hanged to death at the prison site in the 1960s. During the early seventies some western hippie type tourists caught with drugs were also held here pending trial. It was pretty casual in the jail for the westerners. Hashish smoking was allowed inside the prison. There was in fact a large hookah set up under a tree that the inmates smoked from. Inmates had to provide for their own food.  During the 1980s, the facility was used by KHAD to detain and torture members of the Mujahideen movement in order to extract information about rebel activities.

According to American intelligence analysts the Taliban used the prison as a "political prison". The Taliban had confined Ismail Khan at Sarpuza prison for a short time in 1999. Guantanamo detainee Abd Al Rahim Abdul Raza Janko described being held in the prison following his torture by the Taliban.

The record shows that the prison continued to be used in the post-Taliban era for detention and interrogation. Guantanamo detainee Sultan Sari Sayel Al Anazi faced the allegation that when he was held in the prison, prior to being sent to Guantanamo:
While imprisoned at Sarapuza jail in Kandahar the detainee collaborated with other prisoners to hide money in mattresses and bed frames in his prison cell.

A number of the captives were later transported in May 2012 to extrajudicial detention in the Guantanamo Bay detention camps, in Cuba, and finally to the Parwan Detention Facility next to Bagram Air Base north of Kabul.

Captives reported to have been in held in American custody in Kandahar

Prison attack of 2008

In May 2008, 200 prisoners went on hunger strike protesting detention without charge for up to two years.  Many others faced summary trials they felt were unfair.  Forty-seven inmates physically stitched their mouths shut. The strike ended when the Afghan parliament agreed to review their detentions.
 
On June 13, 2008, the Taliban orchestrated the escape of 1,200 prisoners, including 350 Taliban by having two suicide bombers in a tanker truck blow up the main gates. Subsequently, 30 men arrived on motorcycles, killed 15 guards, and broke the locks on every cell.

Following the prison breakout, the prison was rebuilt with major fortifications.

Tunneling escape of 2011

On April 24, 2011, a 350m tunnel that had been dug across a highway and under the prison walls, was used in the escape of about 475 Taliban inmates. The escape has been compared to the Stalag Luft III tunnel escape in World War 2. The breakout was not detected for four hours, during which most of the prisoners
were transported away. It was reported that at least 71 of the escapees were recaptured.

Release of prisoners in 2021
During the Battle of Kandahar as part of the Taliban offensive, Taliban insurgents assaulted the city to gain control from the Afghan National Security Forces. After weeks of fighting, they overran the city on 12 August 2021, during which they released over 1,000 prisoners from the Sarposa prison.

See also 
List of prisons in Afghanistan

References

Buildings and structures in Kandahar
Prisons in Afghanistan
Extrajudicial prisons of the United States